Neurotomy may refer to the application of heat (as in radio frequency nerve lesioning) or freezing to sensory nerve fibers to cause their temporary degeneration, usually to relieve pain. Neurotomy and neurolysis (where the degeneration is caused by the application of chemical agents) are forms of neurolytic block. "Neurotomy" is sometimes used as a synonym for neurectomy, the surgical cutting or removal of nervous tissue.

References

Neurosurgery